Here is a list of songs recorded by the South Korean six-member boy band VIXX and their sub-unit VIXX LR, formed by Jellyfish Entertainment. The credits for the Korean releases are adapted from the official homepage of the group.

 Color key
 Single  Pre-release single

0–9

A

B

C

D

E

F

G

H

I

J

L

M

N

O

P

R

S

T

U

V

W

Y

Other songs

See also
VIXX discography
List of awards and nominations received by VIXX
List of songs written by Ravi

References

External links
 VIXX at Jellyfish Entertainment 
 VIXX Japan Official Site 

 
Lists of songs recorded by South Korean artists